Toyooka is a city in Hyōgo Prefecture, Japan.

Toyooka may also refer to:

Toyooka, Nagano, a village in Shimoina District, Nagano Prefecture, Japan
Toyooka, Shizuoka, a former village in Iwata District, Shizuoka Prefecture, Japan
Toyooka Domain, a feudal domain of Japan
Toyooka Station (disambiguation), multiple railway stations in Japan

People with the surname
, Japanese cyclist